Lethrinus mahsena, common names the sky emperor, mahsena emperor, and cutthroat emperor, is a species of emperor fish. It grows to 65 cm in length, but is commonly found at 35 to 45 cm. This fish may be yellow to greenish-blue or olive-grey, becoming paler toward the belly. It is a non-migratory, reef-associated fish that has a high commercial value.

Description
The body of this species may be yellow to greenish-blue or olive-grey, becoming paler toward the belly. It commonly has nine to ten vertical bars of colour that are yellow-green or brown and a horizontal yellow stripe lattice pattern. The base of the scales may be dark or even black. At the base of the pectoral fins, there is a red bar. It grows to a maximum length of 65 cm, but is commonly found at 35 to 45 cm.

The head is purplish-grey, occasionally with a red patch on the nape. It has a moderately short snout. The lips are a strong red colour. There is a red line running from the corner of the mouth toward the tail, and in some specimens there is a line of white or yellow colouration running forward from the eye through the nostrils.

The profile of the dorsal fin is almost straight to slightly concave.

The fins are generally reddish, especially toward the tips.

Distribution
This species is known to live in the Red Sea, the waters of East Africa including the waters around Madagascar. It has also been recorded southern Japan, Polynesia, the Seychelles, Cebu, Philippines, the western Indian Ocean, and the waters of Sri Lanka.

Habitat
Lethrinus mahsena is a non-migratory, reef-associated fish. It lives in waters ranging from 2 to 100 metres in depth. It is found in coral reefs and the adjacent sandy bottoms. It also lives in seagrass areas.

Diet
This fish is known to feed on echinoderms (in particular, sea urchins), crustaceans, and other
fishes. It also eats molluscs, tunicates, sponges, polychaetes.

Human uses
Lethrinus mahsena is highly valued as a commercial fish and is considered to be very expensive. It is also caught by recreational fishers. It may have an undesirable 'coral' taste and odor when caught in some areas of the Indian Ocean. This fish is caught mostly using handlines, traps, and by trawling.

References

External links

Graham M. Pilling, Richard S. Millner, Michael W. Easey, Christopher C. Mees, Shyama Rathacharen, Roland Azemia, Validation of annual growth increments in the otoliths of the lethrinid Lethrinus mahsena and the lutjanid Aprion virescens from sites in the tropical Indian Ocean, with notes on the nature of growth increments in Pristipomoides filamentosus,  4 January 2000, Food and Agriculture Organization
B. Bautil, C.R. Samboo, Preliminary stock assessment for the mahsena emperor (Lethrinus mahsena) on the Nazareth Bank of Mauritius, Food and Agriculture Organization
 

Lethrinidae
Fish described in 1775
Taxa named by Peter Forsskål